
Year 439 BC was a year of the pre-Julian Roman calendar. At the time, it was known as the Year of the Consulship of Lanatus and Barbatus (or, less frequently, year 315 Ab urbe condita). The denomination 439 BC for this year has been used since the early medieval period, when the Anno Domini calendar era became the prevalent method in Europe for naming years.

Events 
 By place 
 Greece 
 As a result of Persian assistance to Samos, it takes the Athenian army nine months to successfully complete its siege of Samos and force the Samians to surrender. Samos becomes a tributary of Athens.

 Roman Republic 
 Spurius Maelius, a wealthy Roman plebeian, tries to buy popular support with the aim of making himself king. During the severe famine affecting Rome, he buys up a large store of grain and sells it at a low price to the people of Rome – the first time this had been done in Rome. This leads Lucius Minucius, the patrician praefectus annonae ("president of the market"), to accuse Maelius of seeking to take over the government.
 Maelius is summoned before Cincinnatus (who has again become dictator of the Roman Republic, to put down a revolt by the plebeians), but refuses to appear. Shortly thereafter, Maelius is killed by Gaius Servilius Ahala and his house is burnt to the ground.

Births 
Spurius Maelius - was the youngest man to ever attempt taking over Rome

Deaths 
 Lucius Quinctius Cincinnatus

Spurius Maelius - was the youngest man to ever attempt taking over Rome

References